Neoheterophrictus uttarakannada is a species of spiders in the genus Neoheterophrictus from India. It was first described in 2012 by Manju Siliwal, Neha Gupta, & Robert John Raven. Its name comes from the place where it was discovered, Uttara Kannada.

Characteristics 
The species is only known from the female. It is identified by two short spermathecae receptacles (which show some constriction at the ends), with multiple (6-7) large contiguous lobes at the end. Its legs have short yellow-orange tarsal hairs, and the full body colour is grey-brown. It makes temporary holes under stones.

References

Theraphosidae
Spiders described in 2012
Spiders of the Indian subcontinent